The Czech Basketball Federation, also known as (ČBF) is the governing body of basketball in the Czech Republic. It was founded after the dissolution of the unified state in 1993, with the Slovakia national basketball team continuing as the successor of the Czechoslovak team.

They organize national competitions in the Czech Republic for the Czech men's national team and Czech women's national team.

The top level professional league is the National Basketball League.

See also 
Czech national basketball team
Czech women's national basketball team

External links
 Official website 
Czech Republic at FIBA site

Basketball in the Czech Republic
Basketball governing bodies in Europe
Basketball